Mari Grace Preciosa Hipolito-Castelo, commonly known as Precious Hipolito-Castelo, is a Filipina actress, newscaster, and politician who last served as Representative of the 2nd district of Quezon City in the Philippines. She also served as city councilor from the same district from 2010 to 2019. She is a former child star, film and television actress and newscaster. In 1987, she won the FAMAS Award as Best Child Actress for Ang Daigdig Ay Isang Butil Na Luha.

Career
In 1985, when she was 6 years old, she reached the finals n Eat Bulaga!'s Little Miss Philippines segment along with Donna Cruz.

Hipolito's first movie was The Life Story Of Julie Vega in 1985. Her next films were Mga Anghel Ng Diyos (1986) and Ang Daigdig ay Isang Butil na Luha (1986), for which she received the FAMAS Best Child Actress Award. She starred in ABS-CBN's drama anthology Stop: Child Abuse. She joined That's Entertainment Wednesday Group along with Sheryl Cruz, Romnick Sarmenta and Chuckie Dreyfus. She was a newscaster for IBC Express Balita from 2001 to 2009.

Personal life
She studied Communication Arts at the University of Santo Tomas. She is married to Winston Castelo, a former congressman and councilor of Quezon City. They have a daughter and a son.

Politics
In 2010, she was elected to the Quezon City Council, representing the 2nd district, following her husband's election as Congressman in the same district. She was re-elected in 2013 and 2016.

In 2018, she joined the newly-created political alliance Hugpong ng Pagbabago and in the 2019 election won a congressional seat in the House of Representatives under the ticket of Joy Belmonte, succeeding her husband. She was named Assistant Majority Floor Leader in August 2019. She was one of the 70 representatives who voted in 2020 to deny the franchise renewal of ABS-CBN. She sought re-election in 2022, this time under Lakas-CMD and the Malayang QC ticket of Mike Defensor, but lost to Ralph Tulfo.

Filmography
IBC Express Balita (TV news) (2001–2009)
Canary Brothers Of Tondo (1992)
Lumayo Ka Man Sa Akin (1992)
Anak Ng Cabron: Ikalawang Ugat (1991)
Naughty Boys (1990)
Everlasting Love (1989)
Jacky Tyan (1988)
Cobrador (1986)
Ang Daigdig Ay Isang Butil Na Luha (1986)
Mga Anghel Ng Diyos (1986)
That's Entertainment (TV show) (1986–1996)
The Life Story Of Julie Vega (1985)
Stop: Child Abuse (TV show)

References

External links

1970s births
Living people
Filipino actor-politicians
That's Entertainment Wednesday Group Members
Liberal Party (Philippines) politicians
PDP–Laban politicians
Nationalist People's Coalition politicians
Lakas–CMD politicians
University of Santo Tomas alumni
That's Entertainment (Philippine TV series)
IBC News and Public Affairs people
People from Quezon City
Actresses from Metro Manila
Quezon City Council members
Metro Manila city and municipal councilors
Filipino broadcasters
Members of the House of Representatives of the Philippines from Quezon City